Plum Grove School is a historic one-room school located near Laclede, Linn County, Missouri.  It was built about 1905, and is a one-story, gable end, frame building. Also on the property is a contributing coal house with woodshed.  The school closed in 1947.

It was added to the National Register of Historic Places in 1994.

References

One-room schoolhouses in Missouri
School buildings on the National Register of Historic Places in Missouri
School buildings completed in 1905
Buildings and structures in Linn County, Missouri
National Register of Historic Places in Linn County, Missouri
1905 establishments in Missouri